Marta Włodkowska (born 9 August 1973) is a Polish backstroke and medley swimmer. She competed in two events at the 1992 Summer Olympics.

References

External links
 

1973 births
Living people
Polish female backstroke swimmers
Polish female medley swimmers
Olympic swimmers of Poland
Swimmers at the 1992 Summer Olympics
Sportspeople from Szczecin